Patchwork is a form of needlework that involves sewing together pieces of fabric into a larger design. 

Patchwork may also refer to:
 Patchwork (Bobbie Gentry album)
 Patchwork (Passenger album)
 Patchwork (board game), a sewing-based board game
 Patchwork (software), a free, web-based patch tracking system
 "Patchwork", a song on Tindersticks (1993 album)